Ilkka Pikkarainen (born April 19, 1981) is a Finnish ice hockey right winger who last played for IPK in Mestis. Most of his career has been spent in the Finnish Liiga, though he also played 31 games in the National Hockey League with the New Jersey Devils during the 2009–10 season.

Career
Pikkarainen began his professional career in the SM-liiga with HIFK at the end of the 2000–01 season. He played there for two full seasons and was drafted by the New Jersey Devils in the seventh round of the 2002 NHL Entry Draft, 218th overall. Pikkarainen came over to North America to play for the Albany River Rats, the Devils' American Hockey League affiliate, starting in the 2003–04 season. After playing in the AHL for three seasons, Pikkarainen returned to play with HIFK for the 2008–09 season, where he played in 54 games and scored 24 goals, leading the team.

The Devils re-signed Pikkarainen at age 28 on July 2, 2009, intending to keep him on the NHL roster. After missing the Devils' first game of the 2009–10 season with the stomach flu, Pikkarainen made his NHL debut on October 5 against the New York Rangers, and later scored his first NHL goal against the Montreal Canadiens on December 16, 2009. In January 2010, Pikkarainen cleared waivers to play in the KHL for CSKA Moscow after the Devils had decided that he was unable to fully adjust to the NHL style, partially due to health reasons.

In May 2010, Ilkka signed with Timrå IK in Sweden.

Career statistics

References

External links

1981 births
Living people
Albany River Rats players
HC CSKA Moscow players
Finnish expatriate ice hockey players in Russia
Finnish expatriate ice hockey players in Germany
Finnish ice hockey right wingers
HC TPS players
HIFK (ice hockey) players
Iisalmen Peli-Karhut players
KalPa players
Lahti Pelicans players
New Jersey Devils draft picks
New Jersey Devils players
People from Sonkajärvi
Ravensburg Towerstars players
Timrå IK players
Sportspeople from North Savo
Finnish expatriate ice hockey players in the United States